William, Willie, Will, Bill, or Billy Smith may refer to:

Academics
 William Smith (Master of Clare College, Cambridge) (1556–1615), English academic
 William Smith (antiquary) (c. 1653–1735), English antiquary and historian of University College, Oxford
 William Smith (scholar) (1711–1787), classical scholar and Anglican Dean of Chester
 William Smith (Episcopal priest) (1727–1803), First Provost of the University of Pennsylvania
 William Pitt Smith (1760–1796), American physician, educator and theological writer
 William Smith (lexicographer) (1813–1893), English lexicographer
 William Robertson Smith (1846–1894), philologist, physicist, archaeologist, and Biblical critic
 William Benjamin Smith (1850–1934), professor of mathematics at Tulane University
 William Ramsay Smith (1859–1937), Australian anthropologist
 William Hall Smith (1866–?), President of the Mississippi Agricultural and Mechanical College, 1916–1920
 William Cunningham Smith (1871–1943), American academic of English literature, university administrator, and writer
 William Charles Smith (1881–1972), English musicologist
 William Newton-Smith (born 1943), Anglo-Canadian philosopher of science
 William George Smith (1866–1918), Scottish psychologist
 William Andrew Smith (1802–1870), American college president and clergyman
 William Roy Smith, American academic historian

Arts and entertainment
 Will Smith (born 1968), American actor, rapper and film producer
 William "Gentleman" Smith (1730–1819), English actor
 William H. Smith (author), the main writer of the 1844 temperance play The Drunkard
 William Smith (actor) (1933–2021), American actor
 William Smith (teacher) (born 1939), South African television science and mathematics teacher
 Will Smith (comedian) (born 1971), British comedian, actor and writer

Art and literature
 Bill Smith (jewelry designer) (born 1933), American jewelry designer
 William Arthur Smith (1918–1989), American artist
 William Brooke Smith (died 1908), American artist
 William Collingwood Smith (1815–1887), English painter
 William Craig Smith (1918–1986), American art director
 W. Eugene Smith (1918–1978), American photojournalist
 William Gardner Smith (1927–1974), African-American novelist
 William Hart-Smith (1911–1990), New Zealand/Australian poet
 William Jardine Smith (1834–1884), Australian writer and editor
 William Jay Smith (1918–2015), American poet
 William Smith (poet) (15??–16??), English poet
 William Thompson Russell Smith, Scottish-American painter
 William E. Smith (artist) (1913–1997), African American artist
 William Twigg-Smith (1883–1950), New Zealand artist
 Willi Smith (1948–1987), American fashion designer

Characters
 Bill Smith (Red Green Show character), from Canadian comedy The Red Green Show, played by Rick Green
 Billy Smith (SNL), a recurring character on the live television variety show Saturday Night Live
 Billy Smith, a character in Coronation Street
 Will Smith (The Fresh Prince of Bel-Air), from American sitcom The Fresh Prince of Bel-Air, based on the real-life rapper
 Will Smith (Home and Away), from Australian soap opera Home and Away
 Will Smith, child character in Wee Sing The Best Christmas Ever!

Music
 Barkin' Bill Smith (1928–2000), American Chicago blues singer
 Bill Smith (Canadian musician) (born 1938), Canadian record producer, musician, writer, editor
 Bill Smith (jazz musician) (1926–2020), folk jazz clarinetist, professor of music at the University of Washington
 Major Bill Smith (1922–1994), American record producer and executive
 William Smith (composer) (1603–1645), English composer from the city of Durham
 William "Smitty" Smith (1944–1997), keyboardist and session musician
 Willie "Big Eyes" Smith (1936–2011), blues drummer and singer
 Willie Smith (alto saxophonist) (1910–1967), jazz alto saxophonist
 Willie "The Lion" Smith (1893–1973), jazz pianist
 William Oscar Smith, jazz double bassist and music educator

Business
 William Henry Smith (1792–1865), entrepreneur whose business was about both newsagents and book shops
 William Henry Smith (1825–1891), son of the above, and politician
 William Smith (businessman) (1818–1912), nurseryman and donor to Hobart and William Smith Colleges
 William Reardon Smith (1856–1935), British shipowner
 Willie Reardon Smith (1887–1950), British shipowner
 William Wensley Smith (1887–1955), founder of W.W. Smith Insurance Ltd

Law and crime
 Sir William Cusack-Smith, 2nd Baronet (1766–1836), baronet
 William A. Smith (Iowa judge) (1870–1958), justice of the Iowa Supreme Court
 William A. Smith (Kansas judge) (1888–1968), Associate Justice of the Kansas Supreme Court
 William E. Smith (judge) (born 1959), judge on the United States District Court for the District of Rhode Island
 Sir William James Smith (1853–1912), British judge who served as the chief justice of the Supreme Court of Cyprus, British Guiana and the Transvaal
 William Francis Smith (1904–1968), judge of the United States Court of Appeals for the Third Circuit
 William Kennedy Smith (born 1960), physician and Kennedy family scion who was acquitted of rape in 1991
 William Nimmo Smith, Lord Nimmo Smith (born 1942), former Senator of the College of Justice and a judge of the Supreme Courts of Scotland
 William Owen Smith (1848–1929), lawyer involved in overthrow of the Kingdom of Hawaii
 William Redwood Smith (1851–1935), Associate Justice of the Kansas Supreme Court
 William Scott Smith (born 1959), American serial killer and kidnapper
 William Smith (judge, born 1728) (1728–1793), historian, Chief Justice of the Province of New York, and Chief Justice of the Province of Quebec and later Lower Canada
 William Smith (judge, born 1697) (1697–1769), father of John Smith, Doctor Thomas Smith, Joshua Hett Smith, and Chief Justice William Smith
 William Smith (murderer) (1957–2005), executed by the State of Ohio in 2005
 William "Tangier" Smith (1655–1705), Chief Justice of the Province of New York from 1692
 William Trickett Smith, American lawyer who was disbarred
 William Trickett Smith II (born 1981), his son, American drug trafficker convicted of murdering his wife in Peru in 2007

Military
 Sir Sidney Smith (Royal Navy officer) (William Sidney Smith, 1764–1840), British admiral
 William Smith (1746–1787), commanding officer of the Lincoln minutemen in the battles of Lexington and Concord; see Captain William Smith House
 William Alexander Smith (Boys' Brigade) (1854–1914), founder of the Boys' Brigade
 William Danvers Smith, 2nd Viscount Hambleden (1868–1928), known as Frederick Smith, officer in the British Army
 William Douglas Smith (1865–1939), British general
 William D. Smith (1933–2020), United States Navy admiral
 William Duncan Smith (1825–1862), career United States Army officer
 William Farrar Smith (1824–1903), Union Army general
 William F. Smith (US Army Air Corps), piloted the US Army Air Corps B-25 Billy Mitchell Bomber that crashed into the Empire State Building
 William H. Smith (Medal of Honor) (1847–1877), American Indian Wars soldier and Medal of Honor recipient
 William James Lanyon Smith, New Zealand naval officer
 William Osborne Smith (1833–1887), first Acting Commissioner of the North West Mounted Police
 William Ruthven Smith (1868–1941), United States Army officer
 William Smith (c. 1872–1941), Master of the SS Sauternes, English merchant seaman killed in World War II
 William Smith (Medal of Honor, 1864) (1826–?), American Civil War sailor and Medal of Honor recipient
 William Smith (Medal of Honor, 1869) (1838–?), American Indian Wars soldier and Medal of Honor recipient
 William Smith (Royal Navy officer) (died 1756), served as Commander-in-Chief of the Jamaica Station and rose to Rear Admiral
 William Smith (ship captain) (1768–1846), American ship captain and Revolutionary War veteran
 William Smith (Virginia governor) (1797–1887), Governor of Virginia (1846–1849, 1864–1865) and Confederate general
 William Sooy Smith (1830–1916), American Civil War general
 William Thomas Smith (1896–1994), World War I flying ace
 William Watson Smith (1892–?), World War I flying ace
 William W. Smith (admiral) (1888–1966), United States Navy admiral during World War II
 William Y. Smith (1925–2016), United States Air Force general

Religion
 William Smith (minister) (died 1647), buried in the Prophet's Grave near Largs, North Ayrshire, Scotland
 William Smith (Archdeacon of Armagh) (died 1673), English priest in Ireland
 William Smith (Provost of St Andrew's Cathedral, Aberdeen), 18th-century Scottish priest
 William Smith (Latter Day Saints) (1811–1893), younger brother of Joseph Smith, Jr. and himself a Mormon leader
 William Smith (bishop) (1819–1892), Catholic archbishop of St. Andrews and Edinburgh
 William R. Smith (Mormon) (1826–1894), Mormon leader in Davis County, Utah Territory
 William Saumarez Smith (1836–1909), Anglican bishop/archbishop of Sydney
 William Smith (monsignor) (1939–2009), Catholic theologian
 William Carr Smith (1857–1930), Church of England clergyman
 William Angie Smith (1894–1974), bishop of the Methodist Church and the United Methodist Church

Science and architecture
 Bill Smith (Motorola engineer) (1929–1993), one of the creators of Six Sigma
 William Gardner Smith (botanist) (1866–1928), Scottish botanist and ecologist
 William Smith (architect) (1817–1891), Scottish architect
 William Smith (geologist) (1769–1839), English geologist
 William Wright Smith (1875–1956), Scottish botanist and horticulturalist
 W. Wheeler Smith (c. 1838–c. 1908), American architect and real estate developer

Sports

American football
 Bill Smith (American football, born 1912) (1912–1999), American football end
 Bill Smith (American football, born 1926) (1926–2009), American football tackle and end
 Billy Ray Smith Jr. (born 1961), American football player
 Billy Ray Smith Sr. (1935–2001), American football player
 Wee Willie Smith (American football) (1910–1996), American football player
 William F. Smith (American football) (1888–?), American college football player and coach
 Willie Smith (American football coach) (born 1931), 12th head college football coach for the North Carolina Central University Eagles
 Willie Smith (offensive tackle, born 1937) (born 1937), former American football player
 Willie Smith (offensive tackle, born 1986) (born 1986), American football offensive tackle
 Willie Smith (tight end) (born 1964), American football tight end
 Will Smith (defensive end) (1981–2016), American football defensive end
 Will Smith (linebacker, born 1992), American football linebacker

Association football
 Bill Smith (footballer, born 1887) (1887–1929), English footballer with Brentford, Southampton and Halifax Town
 Bill Smith (footballer, born 1897) (1897–?), English footballer with Durham City and York City
 Bill Smith (footballer, born 1906) (1906–1979), English footballer with Norwich City and Exeter City
 Bill Smith (footballer, born 1926) (1926–2014), English footballer with Birmingham City and Blackburn Rovers
 Bill Smith (footballer, born 1938), Scottish footballer with Raith Rovers and Darlington
 Bill Smith (soccer), Canadian soccer player, active 1943–1963
 Billy Smith (footballer, born 1872) (1872–?), English footballer with Wolverhampton Wanderers
 Billy Smith (footballer, born 1873) (1873–1914), Scottish footballer for Newcastle United
 Billy Smith (footballer, born 1882) (1882–?), English footballer for West Bromwich Albion and Birmingham
 Billy Smith (footballer, born 1895) (1895–1951), English footballer with Huddersfield Town
 Billy Smith (footballer, born 1900) (1900–?), English footballer with Hartlepool United, Huddersfield Town and Rochdale
 Billy Smith (footballer, born 1906) (1906–1963), English footballer with South Shields, Portsmouth and Stockport County
 Billy Smith (Scottish footballer) (c. 1931–2009), Scottish footballer with Aberdeen
 Buxton Smith (William Smith), English footballer with Buxton and Manchester City
 Stockport Smith (William Smith), English footballer with Stockport and Manchester United
 William A. Smith (footballer), English footballer with Blackburn Rovers
 William Smith (footballer, born 1865) (1865–?), English goalkeeper with Burnley
 William Smith (footballer, born 1868) (1868–1907), English footballer with Lincoln City, Loughborough, Notts County and Nottingham Forest
 William Smith (footballer, born 1886) (1886–1956), footballer with Bradford City and Stoke
 William Smith (footballer, born 1903) (1903–?), English footballer
 William Smith (Scottish footballer), footballer with Hibernian
 Willie Smith (footballer, born 1943), Scottish footballer with Brentford
 Willie Smith (footballer, born 1948), English footballer with Wimbledon
 Will Smith (footballer, born 1998), English footballer for Harrogate Town
W. J. "Billy" Smith, football manager, Aston Villa

Baseball
 Big Bill Smith (1869–?), Negro leagues baseball catcher and manager
 Bill Smith (baseball executive) (born 1958), Minnesota Twins general manager
 Bill Smith (baseball manager), National Association player-manager for the Baltimore Marylands
 Bill Smith (pitcher) (1934–1997), American left-handed pitcher in Major League Baseball, 1958–59; 1962
 Bill Smith (outfielder) (1865–1886), American baseball outfielder for the 1884 Cleveland Blues
 Billy Smith (baseball coach) (born 1930), American minor league first baseman and manager and Major League coach and scout
 Billy Smith (1980s pitcher) (born 1954), American pitcher in Major League Baseball, 1981
 Billy Smith (1880s pitcher) (1861–1928), American right-handed pitcher in Major League Baseball, 1886
 Billy Smith (second baseman) (born 1953), American infielder in Major League Baseball, 1975–79; 1981
 Willie Smith (outfielder) (1939–2006), American outfielder in Major League Baseball, 1963–1971
 Willie Smith (third baseman), American third baseman in Negro league baseball, 1938
 Willie Smith (1940s pitcher), American pitcher in Negro league baseball, 1948
 Willie Smith (1990s pitcher) (born 1967), American pitcher in Major League Baseball, 1994
 Will Smith (pitcher) (born 1989), American pitcher in Major League Baseball
 Will Smith (catcher) (born 1995), American baseball catcher
 Dark Night Smith (William C. Smith), American pitcher in Negro league baseball, 1920–1924

Basketball
 Bill Smith (basketball, born 1939), American basketball player
 Wee Willie Smith (1911–1992), American basketball player
 William Smith (basketball, born 1949), American basketball player
 Willie Smith (basketball) (born 1953), American professional basketball player

Cricket
 Bill Smith (cricketer) (1937–2018), English cricketer
 William Brook-Smith (1885–1952), New Zealand cricketer
 William Smith (cricketer, born 1839) (1839–1897), first class cricketer for Yorkshire
 William Smith (cricketer, born 1875) (1875–1942), first-class cricketer for London County
 William Smith (cricketer, born 1882) (1882–?), English cricketer
 William Smith (cricketer, born 1900) (1900–1990), English cricketer
 William Smith (cricketer, born 1902) (1902–1937), Scottish cricketer
 William Smith (Kent cricketer) (1819–1883), English cricketer
 William Smith (Somerset cricketer) (1871–1946), English cricketer
 Willie Smith (cricketer) (1885–1964), English cricketer
 Will Smith (cricketer) (born 1982), English cricketer

Rugby football
 Bill Smith, Australian rugby league footballer in the Bulimba Cup
 Bill Smith, rugby league right wing of the 1950s for Whitehaven
 Billy Smith (rugby league, born 1942), Australian rugby league player
 Billy Smith (rugby league, born 1999), Australian rugby league player
 Will Smith (rugby league) (born 1992), Australian rugby league player
 William Smith (rugby union) (1881–1945), New Zealand rugby union player

Other sports
 Bill Smith (Australian rules footballer) (1936–2010), Australian rules footballer for Fitzroy
 Billy Smith (Australian footballer) (1894–1953), played with North Melbourne in the Victorian Football League
 Bill Smith (fell runner) (1936–2011), fell runner and author on the sport
 Bill Smith (motorcyclist) (born 1935), former Grand Prix motorcycle road racer
 Bill Smith (poker player) (1934–1996), professional poker player
 Bill Smith (swimmer) (1924–2013), two-time gold medalist in the 1948 Olympic games
 Billy Dee Smith (born 1982), professional lacrosse player
 Billy Smith (ice hockey) (born 1950), Canadian ice hockey goaltender
 Mysterious Billy Smith (1871–1937), Canadian boxer
 William Alexander Smith (boxer) (1904–1955), South African boxer of the 1920s
 William Smith (cyclist) (1893–1958), South African Olympic cyclist
 William Smith (field hockey) (1886–1937), British field hockey player who competed in the 1920 Summer Olympics
 William Smith (golfer) (1865–1936), American golfer
 William Smith (sport shooter) (1877–1953), Canadian Olympic sport shooter
 William Smith (wrestler) (1928–2018), 1952 Olympic gold medalist
 Willie Smith (billiards player) (1886–1982), English professional player of snooker and English billiards
 Willie Smith (golfer) (1876–1916), Scottish golfer
 Willie Smith (hurdler) (born 1977), Namibian track and field hurdler
 Willie Smith (sprinter) (1956–2020), American 400 metres runner

Politics

Australia
 William Collard Smith (1830–1894), treasurer in colonial Victoria (Australia)
 William Laird Smith (1869–1942), Australian representative for Denison, 1910–1922 and Minister for the Navy, 1920–1921
 William Forgan Smith (1887–1953), Premier of the Australian state of Queensland, 1932–1942
 William Kennedy Smith (Australian politician) (1888–1933)

Canada
 William Smith (Nova Scotia politician) (died 1779), merchant, judge and politician in Nova Scotia
 Amor De Cosmos (William Alexander Smith, 1825–1897), Premier of British Columbia
 William Henry Smith (Canadian politician) (1826–1890), lawyer and political figure in Nova Scotia, Canada
 William Smith (Canadian politician) (1847–1931), member of Canadian House of Commons 1887–1921
 William C. Smith (politician) (1875–1968), politician from Alberta, Canada
 William Haslam Smith (1891–?), businessman and political figure in Nova Scotia, Canada
 William Duncan Smith (politician) (1899–1977), Canadian politician in the Legislative Assembly of British Columbia
 Bill Smith (Alberta politician) (born 1935), former mayor of Edmonton
 William Smith (Newfoundland politician) (1910–1965), politician in Newfoundland
 J. William Smith, member of the Legislative Assembly of New Brunswick

New Zealand
 William Mein Smith (1798–1869), key actor in the early settlement of New Zealand's capital city, Wellington
 William Cowper Smith (1843–1911), Liberal Party Member of Parliament in New Zealand

United Kingdom
 William Goldsmith alias Smith (died 1517), MP for Gloucester
 William Smith (fl. 1553–54), MP for Newport (Cornwall)
 William Smith (died 1591), MP for Wells
 William Smith (MP for Ripon) (1550–1626), MP for Ripon
 William Smith (MP for Aylesbury) (1568–1620), MP for Aylesbury, 1604
 William Smith (surveyor), fl 1726
 William Smith (Ordnance) (1721–1803), of Chichester, UK, Treasurer of the Ordnance
 William Smith (abolitionist) (1756–1835), grandfather of Florence Nightingale, dissenter and British MP
 William Smith of Carbeth Guthrie (1787–1871), Lord Provost of Glasgow
 William Henry Smith (1825–1891), MP and Cabinet Minister (First Lord of the Admiralty, War Secretary)
 William Masters Smith (1802–1861), Member of Parliament for West Kent
 William Smith (1849–1913), Member of Parliament for North Lonsdale, 1892–1895
 William Smith, 3rd Viscount Hambleden (1903–1948), British peer
 William Smith, 4th Viscount Hambleden (1930–2012), British peer
 William Smith (loyalist) (1954–2016), Northern Irish loyalist politician

United States
 William Smith (Maryland politician) (1728–1814), member of the U.S. House of Representatives from Maryland (1789–1791)
 William Smith (New York state senator) (1720–1799), New York politician and judge
 William Smith (Oregon politician), Oregon state senator (1890s)
 William Smith (South Carolina representative) (1751–1837), member of the U.S. House of Representatives from South Carolina (1797–1798)
 William Smith (South Carolina senator) (1762–1840), U.S. senator from South Carolina (1815–1830)
 William Smith (Virginia governor) (1797–1887), Governor of Virginia (1846–1849, 1864–1865) and Confederate general
 William Smith (Virginia representative), member of the U.S. House of Representatives from Virginia (1821–1827)
 William Alden Smith (1859–1932), member of the U.S. House of Representatives (1895–1906) and Senator (1905–1918) from Michigan
 William Alexander Smith (politician) (1828–1888), member of the U.S. House of Representatives from North Carolina (1873–1874)
 William Burns Smith (1844–1917), mayor of Philadelphia
 William C. Smith Jr. (born 1982), Maryland State legislator
 William E. Smith (politician) (1824–1883), Governor of Wisconsin (1878–1882)
 William Ephraim Smith (1829–1890), member of the Confederate (1863–1865) and U.S. (1875–1881) House of Representatives from Georgia
 William Ernest Smith (1890–1973), mayor of Murray, Utah, 1946–1947
 William F. Smith (New York politician) (1901–1950), member of the New York State Assembly (1926–1933)
 William French Smith (1917–1990), U.S. Attorney General (1981–1985)
 William Grover Smith (1857–1921), Lieutenant Governor of Colorado, 1889–1891
 William H. Smith (Connecticut politician) (1842–1915), warden of the Borough of Norwalk, Connecticut
 William Henry Smith (American politician) (1833–1896), newspaper editor and politician, Ohio Secretary of State 1865–1868
 William Hugh Smith (1826–1899), Governor of Alabama (1868–1870)
 William Jay Smith (Tennessee politician) (1823–1913), member of the U.S. House of Representatives from Tennessee
 William L. Smith (barber) (1878–?), Socialist barber from Milwaukee who served three terms in the Wisconsin State Assembly
 William Loughton Smith (1758–1812), member of the U.S. House of Representatives from South Carolina (1789–1798)
 William Lyman Smith (1878–1964), telephone businessman who served one term in the Wisconsin State Assembly and two in the Wisconsin State Senate
 William M. Smith, Speaker of the Illinois House of Representatives
 William Nathan Harrell Smith (1812–1889), member of the U.S. House of Representatives from North Carolina (1859–1860)
 William Orlando Smith (1859–1932), member of the U.S. House of Representatives from Pennsylvania (1903–1906)
 William R. Smith (Mormon) (1826–1894), member of the Utah Territory House of Representatives
 William Robert Smith (1863–1924), member of the U.S. House of Representatives from Texas (1903–1916)
 William Rudolph Smith (1787–1868), politician in the states of Pennsylvania and Wisconsin
 William Russell Smith (1815–1896), member of the U.S. House of Representatives from Alabama (1851–1856)
 William Stephens Smith (1755–1816), member of the U.S. House of Representatives from New York (1813–1816) and son-in-law of President John Adams
 William T. Smith (1916–2010), member of the New York State Senate

Other persons
 William Smith (conservationist) (1852–1942), New Zealand gardener, naturalist and conservationist
 William Smith (shearer) (1896–1947), perhaps the most skilled sheep-shearer in the first half of the 20th century
 William Smith (mariner) (1790–1847), British mariner and discoverer of the South Shetland Islands
 William Smith (physician), Scottish American physician
 William Smith (registrar) (1816–1895), Ghanaian civil servant
 William Crawford Smith (1837–1899), American architect
 William R. Smith (physician) (born 1973), American emergency physician and wilderness medicine consultant
 William Robert Smith (physician) (1850–1932), British public health expert
 William Tyler Smith (1815–1873), English obstetrician, medical writer and journalist
 William Wragg Smith (1808–1875), American planter, lawyer, naturalist, translator and poet

See also
 Hobart and William Smith Colleges, a private liberal arts college in Geneva, New York
 William Smith House (disambiguation), several buildings
 W. Smith (rugby league), Australian rugby league player
 Billy Ray Smith (disambiguation)
 Willard Smith (disambiguation)
 William Smyth (disambiguation)
 William Smythe (disambiguation)
 William Schmidt (disambiguation)
 Wilhelm Schmidt (disambiguation)
 List of people with surname Smith